David Robert Madison Genn is a Canadian musician, producer, and songwriter. He is a member of the rock group 54-40, and a former member of the Matthew Good Band.

Early life
Genn was born in Vancouver, British Columbia, on 2 March 1969. He is the son of artist G Robert Genn.

Career

Dead Surf Kiss (DSK)
Dave Genn was a member of Vancouver psychedelic, punk, hard rock, band Dead Surf Kiss, named after their love of The Grateful Dead, Surf music, and KISS.  They had several releases, the first of which was titled "Narcotic Nevada" via Vancouver label "Onslot Music" in 1991.  The album was produced by Dave Ogilvie (Skinny Puppy) and Dan Tanna.  "Onslot Music" later signed a sub-distro deal in the USA with BMG Music.  They played shows at Vancouver's Town Pump Cabaret.  DSK was the opening act for BMG label-mates TOOL on their North American tour, in the early 1990s.

Matthew Good Band
Genn spent six years with the Matthew Good Band between 1995 and 2001 when he served as the band's lead guitarist and keyboardist, co-writing many of the band's songs with Matthew Good.

54-40
Genn joined the band 54-40 in 2003. As of 2019 he continues to tour and record with the group.

Personal life
In February 2006, Genn married local CTV Vancouver news anchor/TV personality Tamara Taggart. Glenn has a son and two daughters.

References

External links
54-40 homepage

1969 births
Living people
Canadian rock guitarists
Canadian male guitarists
Canadian rock keyboardists
Canadian male singer-songwriters
Musicians from Vancouver
Canadian alternative rock musicians
Alternative rock guitarists
Alternative rock keyboardists